King An of Zhou, personal name Ji Jiao, was the thirty-third king of the Chinese Zhou dynasty and the twenty-first of the Eastern Zhou. 

He succeeded his father King Weilie of Zhou on the throne of China in 401 BC and reigned until his death in 376 BC. After he died, his son King Lie of Zhou ruled over China. His other son was King Xian of Zhou.

Family
Sons:
 Prince Xi (d. 369 BC), ruled as King Lie of Zhou from 375–369 BC
 Prince Bian (d. 321 BC), ruled as King Xian of Zhou from 368–321 BC

Ancestry

See also
Family tree of ancient Chinese emperors

References 

376 BC deaths
Zhou dynasty kings
4th-century BC Chinese monarchs
5th-century BC Chinese monarchs
Year of birth unknown